A Bulgarian umbrella is an umbrella with a hidden pneumatic mechanism which injects a small poisonous pellet containing ricin. It has a hollowed stalk in which the pellet neatly sits.

Such an umbrella was used in and named for the assassination of the Bulgarian dissident writer Georgi Markov on 7 September 1978 (the birthday of the Bulgarian State Council chairman Todor Zhivkov, who had often been the target of Georgi Markov's criticism) on Waterloo Bridge in London. Markov died four days later. It was also allegedly used in the failed assassination attempt against the Bulgarian dissident journalist Vladimir Kostov the same year in the Paris Métro. The poison used in both cases was ricin. Both assassination attempts are believed to have been organized by the Bulgarian Secret Service of the time of the Cold War with the assistance of the KGB.

Such an umbrella was intended to be used in the assassination of Pallo Jordan and Ronnie Kasrils by the South African Civil Cooperation Bureau death squad.

Cultural influence 
These two cases inspired:
 The Spanish giallo film A Dragonfly for Each Corpse. (1973)
 The episode "Hot Ice" of Quincy, M.E. (1978)
 The Markov case was referenced directly, and a similar assassination method used, in the 1979 novel The Green Ripper by John D. MacDonald.
 The French film Le Coup du parapluie (The Umbrella Coup) directed by Gérard Oury and starring Pierre Richard (1980)
 The episode "At All Costs" of The Sandbaggers (1980)
 Two episodes of the British political comedy series Yes, Minister / Yes, Prime Minister, where in "The Death List" (1981) the titular Minister Jim Hacker is told of various risks by methods of assassination, and in "A Diplomatic Incident" (1987) a Bulgarian Umbrella is suggested as a way to kill a French puppy that was intended as gift to the Queen, to prevent a diplomatic incident caused by quarantine regulations
 Bulgarian writer Stefan Kisyov's novel The Executioner (2003)
 The episode "Seven Thirty-Seven" of the American crime drama Breaking Bad (2009)
 The episode "I, Murdoch" of Murdoch Mysteries (2009)
 The episode "Obsession" of NCIS (2010)
 The episode Marionette of Fringe (2010)
 The episode "The Clock" of The Americans (2013)
 The 2022 Steven Soderbergh thriller Kimi features a public injection of an unknown sedative using the tip of an umbrella.

See also 
 Francesco Gullino, alleged Bulgarian umbrella murderer
 MythBusters "Exploding Toilet" – the feasibility of this type of assassination was confirmed in the first episode of MythBusters.

Further reading
The Bulgarian Umbrella: The Soviet Direction and Operations of the Bulgarian Secret Service in Europe by Vladimir Kostov, Harvester Press (1988)
 The Global Investigative Journalism Casebook ed by Mark Hunter for UNESCO (2012)
 A Spy's London by  Roy Berkeley and Rupert Allason, Pen & Sword Books (1994)
 Communication in Eastern Europe: The Role of History, Culture, and Media in Contemporary Conflicts ed by Fred L. Casimir, pub by Lawrence Erlbaum (1995)

References 

Projectile weapons
Weapons of the Cold War
Umbrellas